Doley is a surname. Mostly found in mising community of assam(India).
Notable people with the surname include:

Clayton Doley (born 1974), Australian musician
Harold Doley (born 1947), American businessman
Jogeswar Doley, Indian politician
Lachy Doley (born 1978), Australian musician
Lalit Kumar Doley, Indian politician
Naba Kumar Doley, Indian politician